Rijeka Crnojevića (Montenegrin Cyrillic: Ријека Црнојевића, lit. "River of Crnojević") is a town in Montenegro on the eponymous Rijeka Crnojevića river, near the coast of Skadar lake.

History

The Ottomans captured Žabljak Crnojevića in 1478 after they defeated main army of Ivan Crnojević in late 1477 or early 1478. Ivan moved his seat to Obod (fortified by him in 1475) which was soon renamed to Rijeka Crnojevića, and became the new capital of Montenegro.

Rijeka Crnojevića was the historical seat of Riječka nahija, one of the four territorial units of Old Montenegro.

Demographics

See also 
Crnojević printing house
Rijeka Crnojevića (river)
Rijeka Crnojevića bridge

References 

Populated places in Cetinje Municipality
Former national capitals
Former capitals of Montenegro